Lelong is a surname. Notable people with the surname include:

 Charles Lelong (1891–1970), French track and field athlete 
 Jacques Lelong (1665–1721), French bibliographer 
 Lucien Lelong (1889–1958), French couturier 
 Pierre Lelong (1912–2011), French mathematician 
 Pierre Emile Lelong (1908–1984), French painter 
  (1949–2004), French comics author known for his serial Carmen Cru; see Jean-Marc Lofficier